Czyż is a surname of Polish language origin, meaning "siskin". Surnames of similar derivations include Czyżewski and Czyżowicz. The Czech/Slovak equivalent is Číž and the Belarusian form is Chyzh.

The surname may refer to:
 Bobby Czyz (born 1962), American boxer
 Henryk Czyż (1923–2003), Polish musician
 Olek Czyż (born 1990), Polish basketball player
 Przemysław Czyż (born 1972), Polish diplomat
 Szymon Czyż (born 2001), Polish footballer
 Tom Czyz, American detective
 Vincent Czyz, American avant-garde fiction writer
 Wojtek Czyz (born 1980), German Paralympic track and field athlete
 Lejzor Czyż, the birth name of Leonard Chess (1917–1969), American record company executive
 Fiszel Czyż, the birth name of Phil Chess (1921–2016), American record company executive

See also
 
 Chyzh, Belarusian surname
 Čížek, Czech surname

Polish-language surnames